Peter Johann Christoph Graf von der Pahlen (Kauzmünde Manor, Kauzmünde (now ) - , St. Petersburg) was a Baltic German aristocrat and a general of the Imperial Russian Army.

Life 
Peter was born into the Baltic German noble Pahlen family. His family had a baronetcy until Emperor Alexander I of Russia bestowed Peter's father, Peter Ludwig von der Pahlen, with the title count for him and his sons. who was an organiser of the assassination of the tsar. Peter's brother was Russian diplomat Friedrich Alexander von der Pahlen.

Joining the army at an early age, Palen in 1798 he was promoted to the rank of Colonel and in 1800 to Major General.

Highly decorated for his command in the Polish campaign of the Napoleonic Wars (1806-1807), he retired from service in 1823. Recalled to the army in 1828 for the Russo-Turkish War, he also was a high-ranking Russian commander during the subsequent November Uprising, and notably the Battle of Warsaw (1831).

Pahlen also served as Russian ambassador to the Kingdom of France from March 11, 1835, to April 8, 1841.

References 

1778 births
1864 deaths
Baltic-German people
Imperial Russian Army generals
Hussars
Russian Imperial Hussars officers
Russian people of the November Uprising
House of Pahlen
Ambassadors of the Russian Empire to France